Michael Christian de Pencier,  (born January 19, 1935) is an entrepreneur, environmental investor, and publisher. He is the grandson of Archbishop Adam de Pencier and brother-in-law of Richard A. N. Bonnycastle.

Born in Toronto, Ontario, de Pencier attended Trinity College School, the University of Toronto where he was a member of the Toronto Chapter of Alpha Delta Phi, and the University of Michigan. He is the chairman of Key Publishers Company Limited. In this role, he launched, acquired or ran many of the country’s leading magazines, including Toronto Life, Canadian Geographic, Quill and Quire, Where Magazines and Canadian Business.

An active environmental investor, de Pencier is the co-founder of Investeco Capital Corporation and the Green Living Show. He is also the past Chairman of WWF-Canada and the Ontario College of Art. In 2013, he was honored as the 2013 leader for conservation.

As one of Canada's leading magazine publishers, de Pencier was awarded the Order of Ontario in 1997, the Order of Canada in 1999, and an honorary Doctor of Letters in 2002 from Ryerson University.

He is the father of film producers Nicholas de Pencier and Miranda de Pencier.

References

1935 births
Businesspeople from Toronto
Living people
Members of the Order of Canada
Members of the Order of Ontario
University of Michigan alumni